Ilijaš is a town and municipality located in Sarajevo Canton of the Federation of Bosnia and Herzegovina, an entity of Bosnia and Herzegovina. It is located northwest of the inner city of Sarajevo and was established in May 1952 with the organization of people's committees. Those local people's committees founded the local municipalities, which led to the self-management of the municipalities, including the municipality of Ilijaš.

History
In the early Middle Ages close to the river Bosna and Vogoščica, the district Vogošća, or Vidogošća, was formed. Some later events that are tied to the Ottoman period came to the formation of džemats, nahiyahs, and sanjaks. At the beginning of the nineteenth century, there were 20 džemats in the Sarajevo Nahiyah: Butmir, Kijevo, Presjenica, Sudići, Trnovo, Zijamet Crna Rijeka, Pale, Mokro with Bobogovićima, Kriva Rijeka, Srednje, Čifluk Crna Rijeka, Rakova Noga, Vogošća, Nahorevo, Kulijes, Rakovica, Hadžići, Drozgometva, Pazarić and the villages of Luka and Žeravica.

The occupation of Bosnia and Herzegovina by the Austro-Hungarian Empire led to many changes which manifested in administrative and political changes. The territory of Bosnia and Herzegovina was divided into districts and further divided into counties. The counties were divided into municipalities, instead of džemats, and they were furthermore divided into mahallahs and hamlets while the functions of the muhtars and village chiefs remained the same. The modern municipality of Ilijaš at that time was divided into the Sarajevo and Visoko counties and the boundary line between those two counties was the Povučje stream and the hill Bukovac which was between the stream and Ljubina.
 
The administrative division of Bosnia and Herzegovina until the formation of bans in 1929 remained the same even during the Austro-Hungarian occupation. In 1922, oblasts were formed instead of districts. Everything remained the same until 1941. After the liberation of the temporary national assembly of the Federal Bosnia and Herzegovina, the assembly's first session in August 1945 brought up the law of the territorial division of Bosnia and Herzegovina into districts, counties, and areas of local people's committees and their headquarters.

Demographics
The municipality of Ilijaš is composed of two parts, the town of Ilijaš and the upper municipality. The town of Ilijaš is composed of several localities. The biggest and most urban is the center and which has about 10,000 residents, the second is the settlement of Misoča (Naselje Misoča), with 1,500 residents. Ethnically, there is a majority of Bosniaks with about 1,300 people, 250 are Serbs, 50 are Croats, with none classified as others. Other places, in the municipality of Ilijaš, are Podlugovi, Lješevo, Stari Ilijaš, and Malešići.

1971
According to the 1971 population census there were 23,007 residents.

Serbs – 10,941 (47.55%)
Bosniaks – 9,187 (39.93%)
Croats – 2,172 (9.44%)
Yugoslavs – 400 (1.73%)
others – 307 (1.35%)

1991
According to the 1991 population census there were 25,184 residents.

Serbs – 11,325 (44.96%)
Bosniaks – 10,585 (42.03%)
Croats – 1,736 (6.89%)
Yugoslavs – 1,167 (4.63%)
others – 371 (1.47%)

2013
According to the 2013 population census there were 19,603 residents, 4,921 of them in Ilijaš town.

Bosniaks – 18,151 (92.6%)
Serbs – 421 (2.1%)
Croats – 382 (1.9%)
others – 649 (3.3%)
Note: The Serbian population of the region dropped by more than 97% following the 90s war. Large number of the Serbian population that inhabited this region for centuries, was involved in the Exodus of Sarajevo Serbs , with many fearing a repeat of the 1940's Genocide of Serbs . More than 150 000 Serbs fled Sarajevo fearing for their lives [1].

Settlements
•Balibegovići
•Banjer
•Bokšići
•Buljetovina
•Čemernica
•Četojevići
•Donja Bioča
•Donja Misoča
•Donje Selo
•Donji Čevljanovići
•Dragoradi
•Draževići
•Duboki Potok
•Duševine
•Gajevi
•Gajine
•Gojanovići
•Gornja Bioča
•Gornja Misoča
•Gornji Čevljanovići
•Hadžići
•Han Karaula
•Han Šići
•Homar
•Ilijaš
•Ivančići
•Kadarići
•Kamenica
•Karaula
•Korita
•Košare
•Kožlje
•Krčevine
•Krivajevići
•Kunosići
•Lađevići
•Lipnik
•Luka
•Luka kod Stublina
•Lješevo
•Ljubina
•Ljubnići
•Malešići
•Medojevići
•Moševići
•Mrakovo
•Nišići
•Odžak
•Ozren
•Podlipnik
•Podlugovi
•Popovići
•Rakova Noga
•Ribarići
•Rudnik Čevljanovići
•Solakovići
•Sovrle
•Srednje
•Stomorine
•Stubline
•Sudići
•Šabanci
•Taračin Do
•Velika Njiva
•Vidotina
•Vilić
•Visojevica
•Višnjica
•Vladojevići
•Vlaškovo
•Vrutci
•Vukasovići
•Zakutnica
•Zlotege

Twin towns - sister cities
Ilijaš is twinned with:

 Bayraklı, Turkey

See also
Bijambare
Misoča
Sarajevo
Sarajevo Canton
Vukasovići
Srednje

References

External links

Ilijaš - Official website of the town.

 
Populated places in Ilijaš